Zoie Palmer is a Canadian actress best known for her roles as Dr. Lauren Lewis in the Showcase supernatural drama Lost Girl and as the Android in the SyFy science fiction series Dark Matter.

Early life
Palmer was born in Camborne in Cornwall, England, and emigrated to Canada when she was ten. She attended Sacred Heart Catholic High School in Newmarket, Ontario, and received a Bachelor of Fine Arts from York University in Toronto in 2001. She had her first professional acting role as a teenager, in summer stock at the Red Barn Theatre in Jackson's Point, Ontario.

Career
Palmer's best-known role is that of Dr. Lauren Lewis, a major character in the Canadian series Lost Girl (2010–2015). Her television work includes made-for-TV movies The Reagans (2003) as Patti Reagan, Out of the Ashes (2003) as Didi Goldstein, and Devil's Perch (2005) as Abby. She had a recurring role in the CTV teen drama/comedy series Instant Star as rock singer Patsy Sewer (2006–2007), and was a co-lead in the Global drama The Guard as Coast Guard rescue specialist Carly Greig (2008–2009) (for which she had to conquer her fear of water). Her guest appearances include the "Girl's Best Friend" episode (2011) of The CW espionage drama Nikita as Anya Vimer, a terrorist who tries to sabotage a peace summit; the "Don of the Differently Abled" episode (2011) of the HBO Canada comedy Call Me Fitz as Laura, an unhinged amputee with plans for an escort service for disabled people; and "The Shooting" (2012), the third-season finale of the CTV fantasy drama The Listener as Staff Sgt. McCoy, an investigator for Internal Affairs. She appeared as Rebecca in the "1.1: Single Lesbian Psychos" episode (2009) of the online dating web series comedy Seeking Simone. After Lost Girl, she joined the main cast of science-fiction series Dark Matter as The Android (2015–2017) and hosted After Dark, the series' online aftershow for third-season episodes.

Her film roles include Annabelle in the short drama Terminal Venus (2003), Haley in the romantic comedy The Untitled Work of Paul Shepard (2010), Cheryl in the supernatural horror Devil (2010), Officer Frances Jane in the crime thriller Cold Blooded (2012), Lou in the comedy Sex After Kids (2013), and Bethany in the fantasy adventure Patch Town (2014).

Palmer received the  Best Actor award for Terminal Venus by the 2004 Baja Film Festival (Mexico); and the Gold Medallion Acting Award for Best Actress in a Feature Film for Cold Blooded by the 2012 Bare Bones International Film Festival. She was nominated in 2011 for the ACTRA Award for Outstanding Performance – Female for The Untitled Work of Paul Shepard, and in 2014 by the Canadian Comedy Awards for Multimedia / Best Female Performance in a Feature for Sex After Kids.

In 2013, she won "Favorite TV Actress" and "Best Tweeter" in the annual AfterEllen Visibility Awards for popularity, and "Best Sci-Fi or Fantasy Actress" by Canadagraphs in its annual Best Of TV Awards. She was chosen "Girl on Top 2013" by E! Entertainment Television in its popularity contest of Favorite TV Leading Ladies. She was named #1 in Hello! Canada's annual 50 Most Beautiful Stars issue celebrating homegrown talent in 2014. She received the Fan Choice Award for Favourite Canadian Screen Star by the 2014 Canadian Screen Awards.

Her character of Lauren and Anna Silk's character of Bo, a same-sex couple on Lost Girl, were named one of CNN's all-time "Favorite TV Couples" in 2013, and declared "Top TV Couple of 2013" in E! Entertainment Television's annual online contest.

Social action
In 2018, Palmer was a campaign ambassador for the Women in Film & Television Toronto’s annual WIFT Stars fundraiser.

Filmography

Film

Television

References

External links

 

Living people
21st-century Canadian actresses
Canadian film actresses
Canadian television actresses
Actresses from Toronto
People from Newmarket, Ontario
York University alumni
Year of birth missing (living people)